Transportflotte Speer was a government owned waterways transportation company in Nazi Germany. At its creation it was tasked with the transportation of building material on the German inland waterways. During the war, it became subordinated to the Ministry of Armaments, and was given extensive coastal and inland transportation missions in occupied Europe, mainly in the service of Organisation Todt. The company was named after Albert Speer.

Creation
Transportflotte Speer was founded in 1937 with the task of transporting Swedish and Danish granite from the German coastal ports, to the major Nazi rebuilding projects in Berlin under Albert Speer, as inspector general of building and construction in the capital.

During the war
After the outbreak of the war, the Transportflotte Speer was initially used for transporting coal and other supplies to Berlin. During Operation Sea Lion, its operational headquarters were moved to Groningen in the Netherlands, in order to make better use of Dutch sailors and shipping. In 1942, the Transportflotte Speer was given the mission to supply the Organisation Todt activities in Norway, Denmark and Finland. Personnel strength now rose to about 10,000 sailors, mainly Norwegians who were trained in Sandefjord. Allied bombings of the German rail and road networks, made the inland waterways increasingly more important. In 1944, the Transportflotte Speer had a fleet of more than 2,000 vessels, with a combined deplacement of 500,000 ton dwt. The company serviced 31 sea and canal ports in France, Belgium, the Netherlands, Germany, Denmark, Norway, Finland, Russia, Roumania and Italy.

Norway
Transportflotte Speer was used for the transportation of building material and machinery for German military projects along the Norwegian coast. At the end of the war, the company had a fleet of more than 700 larger and smaller vessels in Norway, with an extensive administrative organization in many Norwegian ports.

Ranks

References

Notes

Cited literature
 Bohn, Robert (2000). Reichskommissariat Norwegen: »Nationalsozialistische Neuordnung« und Kriegswirtschaft. München.
 
 Lepage, Jean Denis G. G. (2015). Hitler’s Armed Forces Auxiliaries. McFarland & Co.
 Military Intelligence Research Section (1945). Handbook of the Organisation Todt. London.
 Seidler, Franz W. (1984). "Das Nationalsozialistiche Kraftfahrkorps und die Organisation Todt im Zweitem Weltkrieg." Vierteljahrshefte für Zeitgeschichte 32(4): 625-636.
 Thomas, Nigel (1992). Wehrmacht Auxiliary Forces. London.
 

Organizations established in 1937
Military history of Germany
Economy of Nazi Germany